The Bergetiger was the name the Allied forces gave to a German World War II armored tracked vehicle based on the Tiger. The vehicle was found abandoned on a roadside in Italy with terminal engine problems. The main gun had been removed, and a boom & winch assembly had been fitted to the turret. No other Tiger tanks modified in this manner were ever recovered.

Naming
At the time the vehicle was found it was assumed the vehicle was intended as a tank recovery vehicle. Germans used the "berge" prefix to denote recovery vehicle versions of tanks, such as the "Bergepanther" and "Bergepanzer". Thus the allies dubbed the vehicle they had found the  "Bergetiger". No official German name for this vehicle has ever been located.

Dispute over purpose
The Bergetiger's role as a recovery vehicle has been disputed ever since its discovery. The evidence often cited against it being a recovery vehicle is that its crane was not designed to tow the weight of a tank, nor was it equipped with any other common recovery equipment.

A popular alternate theory is that the vehicle was field-modified (possibly after suffering damage to the main gun) as either a mine-clearing vehicle, or to drop explosives to clear battlefield obstacles.

Production numbers
Reports of the number of Bergetigers produced varies. No original German documentation to support these numbers has been located.
Some common numbers given are:
 Fifty-eight produced from the factory
 Three produced from the factory
 Three built as "field-expedient" modifications in Italy
 Three built as "field-expedient" modifications and one built from a Tiger damaged while still at the factory.
 Only one built as a "field-expedient" in Italy

References

External links
 Article discussing the probable role of the Bergetiger
 Bergetiger model

Tracked armoured recovery vehicles
World War II armoured fighting vehicles of Germany
Military vehicles introduced from 1940 to 1944
de:Panzerkampfwagen VI Tiger#Bergepanzer